Jiaohuachang Station is a station on Line 7 of the Beijing Subway. It was opened on December 28, 2014. It is located in the former site of the Beijing Jiaohuachang (Coking plant) complex. The station was the terminus of Line 7 until the opening of the phase 2 eastern extension to Huazhuang on December 28, 2019.

Station layout 
The station has 2 underground side platforms.

Exits 
There are 4 exits, lettered A, B, C, and D. Exits A and C are accessible.

Gallery

References

Railway stations in China opened in 2014
Beijing Subway stations in Chaoyang District